The furtive flycatcher (Ficedula disposita) is a species of bird in the family Muscicapidae.
It is endemic to the Philippines. The furtive flycatcher can be identified by a faint, high-pitched, 2-3 note call. The Furtive Flycatcher is a small olive brown bird that stands 11–11.5 centimeters tall

Its natural habitats are subtropical or tropical moist lowland forests and subtropical or tropical moist montane forests.
It is threatened by habitat loss with 1/3 of the Philippines forest cover being lost between 1990 and 2005

References

furtive flycatcher
Birds of Luzon
furtive flycatcher
Taxonomy articles created by Polbot